The chief minister of Uttarakhand is the Head of the government of the Indian state of Uttarakhand. In accordance with the Constitution of India, the governor is a state's de jure head, but de facto executive authority rests with the chief minister. Following elections to the legislative assembly, the state's governor usually invites the party (or coalition) with a majority of seats to form the government. The governor appoints the chief minister, whose council of ministers are collectively responsible to the assembly. Given the confidence of the assembly, the chief minister's term is for five years and is subject to no term limits.

Ten people have served as the state's chief minister since its formation on 9 November 2000. Seven of them, including the inaugural officeholder Nityanand Swami and the incumbent Pushkar Singh Dhami represented the (BJP) while the rest represented the Indian National Congress.

Chief Ministers of Uttarakhand

See also
 Government of Uttarakhand
 Governor of Uttarakhand
 Uttarakhand Legislative Assembly
 Speaker of the Uttarakhand Legislative Assembly
 Leader of the Opposition in the Uttarakhand Legislative Assembly
 Cabinet of Uttarakhand
 Chief Justice of Uttarakhand
 List of current Indian chief ministers
 List of prime ministers of India

Notes

References

External links
 Chief Minister of Uttarakhand, Official website
 Uttarakhand Vidhan Sabha, Official Website

Uttarakhand
 
Chief Ministers